Maoping Township is a township under the administration of Longshan County, Hunan, China. , it has 12 villages under its administration.

See also 
 List of township-level divisions of Hunan

References 

Townships of Hunan
Longshan County